Gabe Rotter is an American television writer/producer and novelist, author of Simon & Schuster's Duck Duck Wally and The Human Bobby. He was a writer and producer on season 11 of The X-Files which aired in 2018.

Early life
Rotter grew up in the same complex in Woodbury, Nassau County, New York, as writer Lesley Arfin and they both attended Syosset High School. He earned a film degree from the University of Southern California. Rotter began his career as a production assistant and later the writers' assistant on the popular paranormal television show "The X-Files," working under series creator Chris Carter.

Career
Rotter wrote his first novel, Duck Duck Wally, which was published by Simon & Schuster in 2008. The novel "...pays entertaining dividends in this slapstick send-up of show business in 
general and hip-hop in particular,” commented a Kirkus Reviews critic. A Publishers Weekly reviewer noted that “Rotter’s a talented writer.”  Booklist called the book "Clever and funny."

In 2010, Rotter published his second novel from Simon & Schuster, titled The Human Bobby. Booklist described the book as "An oddly constructed novel, but an oddly endearing one, too, with a protagonist you can’t help rooting for."

In 2014 Rotter produced a television pilot for Amazon called The After, which was written and directed by Chris Carter.

In 2015 Rotter was a writer/producer on 20th Century Fox Television's 6-episode revival of The X-Files.

In 2017, Rotter was a writer/producer on the eleventh season of The X-Files on Fox, having written one episode titled, "Kitten."

References

Personal life

External links 
 Simon & Schuster Website
 

USC School of Cinematic Arts alumni
Living people
1978 births
American male writers
People from Woodbury, Nassau County, New York
Syosset High School alumni